The Rothschild Lamp is a 16th-century bronze oil lamp. Made by Italian gold and metal-smith Andrea Riccio, the lamp was a longtime possession of the Rothschild family. The lamp was acquired by the Metropolitan Museum of Art in 2009, and remains in the museum's collection.

References 

Individual lamps
Metalwork of the Metropolitan Museum of Art